Farhad Beg Cherkes (died 1614) was a Circassian favourite at the Safavid court of king (shah) Abbas I (r. 1588–1629). Having risen through the gholam ranks, he enjoyed a high position in the royal court, until he was executed following a court intrigue in 1614.

Biography
Farhad Beg started his career as a regular falconer (qushchi) at the Safavid court, until he was promoted to the office of “master of the hunt” (mīr shekār-bāshi) in 1614. Shortly after, he was suspected of forming a subversive relationship with the crown prince, Mohammad Baqer Mirza, whose mother was one of Abbas' Circassian wives.  
Based on this suspicion, in the same year, Abbas handed Farhad Beg to the prince, who, to show his fidelity to his father and the king of the empire, gave immediate orders for Farhad Beg Cherkes' execution and the confiscation of his property. At that time, the Royal camp was situated in Karabagh. Shortly after, fearing the crown prince's popularity, king Abbas ordered another Circassian, Behbud Beg, to murder the crown prince.

References

Sources 
  
 
 

16th-century Iranian politicians
16th-century people of Safavid Iran
Iranian people of Circassian descent
1614 deaths
Year of birth unknown
Safavid ghilman
Masters of the hunt of the Safavid Empire
17th-century people of Safavid Iran
Safavid slaves
17th-century Iranian politicians